Daniel Batista Lima (born 9 September 1964) is a Greek former professional footballer of Cape Verdean descent who played as a forward. He has been given the title "Gullit of the poor" by the Italian press after an impressive display against Torino. He is the Technical Director of Ethnikos Piraeus.

Club career
Batista started his football career at the academies of Feyenoord Rotterdam. After playing there a while a good friend of him and also a Feyenoord supporter brought him to Greece to follow his career there. Batista played for Ethnikos Piraeus in whose colors he impressed and soon became an interest of the big clubs of Athens. Finally, in the summer of 1989, he prefers to transfer to AEK Athens, while Olympiacos also strongly claimed him.

It didn't take long for him to impress at AEK as well. He started very well from his very first season at AEK, even though he had some injuries. Alongside Patikas and Christodoulou, he formed a very good trio in the "yellow-black" offense. The following season was not a good one for the team, but Batista again had a very good season, while among other things he also scored the winning goal against Olympiacos. In both of these years, Batista played mainly as a striker, but the arrival of Dimitriadis and Alexandris in the summer of 1991, made Bajević to play Batista behind the two strikers, in order to "fit" them all in the starting eleven. Batista formed an excellent duo with Dimitriadis in attack and helped AEK to win the championship. He also has excellent performances for the UEFA Cup.

In the summer of 1992, with the expiration of his contract and during a period of administrative changes at AEK, he decided to move to Olympiacos, displeasing the people of the "yellow-blacks". In the club of Piraeus, he had a good presence, but did not reach the high standards he at AEK. However he scored many goals in the matches against his former club. In the summer of 1995, he returned to AEK and got an excellent performance again, as he played a big part in winning the cup, scoring 2 times in the final with Apollon Athens. The following season was also great, despite facing some injuries, creating an excellent trio in the attack with Kostis and Nikolaidis, in a season where AEK was again crowned cup winner. In AEK he played for another 2 seasons and despite the new injuries contributed to club. With AEK he won 1 championship, 2 cups, 2 Super Cups and 1 League Cup. In the summer of 1999, he was released from the club and moved to Aris. Batista retired after the end of the 2000–01 season.

International career
Batista naturalized a Greek citizen, and debuted in the Greece national team on 12 October 1994. He holds the distinction of being the only Greek athlete of black ethnicity to do so. He played 14 times scoring twice.

Managing career
After his playing days were over, Batista coached Diagoras, Fostiras, he was the director of football of Lamia, head coach of AO Nea Ionia, AEK Athens U20, Peramaikos and a technical director of Niki Volos. From the summer of 2021 he is the Technical Director of Ethnikos Piraeus.

Personal life
Batista's uncle, Noni Lima was a former footballer who had a successful career in Greece at Panionios. His nephew and Noni's son, Konstantinos is a player of Episkopi.

Career statistics

Honours
AEK Athens
Alpha Ethniki: 1991–92
Greek Cup: 1995–96, 1996–97
Greek Super Cup: 1989, 1996
Greek League Cup: 1990
Pre-Mediterranean Cup: 1991

Olympiacos
Greek Super Cup: 1992

References

External links

RSSSF – Foreign Players in Greece since 1959/60
RSSSF – Rec.sport.soccer Player of the Year 1998

1964 births
Living people
People from Mindelo
Greek footballers
Greece international footballers
Association football forwards
Super League Greece players
Ethnikos Piraeus F.C. players
AEK Athens F.C. players
Aris Thessaloniki F.C. players
Olympiacos F.C. players
Expatriate footballers in Greece
Cape Verdean footballers
Naturalized citizens of Greece
Greek people of Cape Verdean descent
AEK F.C. non-playing staff
A.O. Nea Ionia F.C. managers
Greek football managers